Mario Edison Giménez (born 5 April 1981 in Pedro Juan Caballero) is a Paraguayan footballer that currently plays for Colombian Primera A side Itagüí as striker.

He began his football career at 2 de Mayo of the first tier of his country, in where scored 25 goals in 31 appearances during two seasons. In January 2007, was sold to Chilean Primera División club Colo-Colo, for a US$400.000 transfer fee. After a regular pass at the Chilean club that was runner-up of the 2006 Copa Sudamericana, he joined to Paraguayan powerhouse Club Olimpia along with his countrymen Gilberto Velásquez in June, after of proclaiming champion of the Apertura Tournament.

In January 2009, he traveled to Colombia and signed for Deportivo Pereira of the country's first tier, after having also spells at Independiente Medellín and Deportivo Cali of the same country. In 2011, he returned to Paraguay and joined to Sportivo Luqueño, after moving to Ecuadorian side Imbabura SC. The next season, Giménez signed for La Equidad.

Giménez also represented the Paraguay national football team in 2006, playing after the FIFA World Cup of that year. He scored one international goal in a 3–2 defeat with Chile at Estadio Sausalito during a friendly match. And also in 2007 playing another friendly against México in Monterrey, he entered the 77th minute by Salvador Cabañas being sent off eight minutes later.

International goals

Honours

Club
Colo-Colo
Primera División de Chile (1): 2007 Apertura

Deportivo Cali
Copa Colombia (1): 2010

References

1981 births
Living people
Paraguayan footballers
Paraguayan expatriate footballers
Paraguay international footballers
Association football forwards
Paraguayan Primera División players
Chilean Primera División players
Categoría Primera A players
Categoría Primera B players
Colo-Colo footballers
2 de Mayo footballers
Club Olimpia footballers
Deportivo Pereira footballers
La Equidad footballers
Deportivo Cali footballers
Independiente Medellín footballers
Sportivo Luqueño players
Nacional Potosí players
Expatriate footballers in Argentina
Expatriate footballers in Chile
Expatriate footballers in Colombia
Expatriate footballers in Ecuador
Expatriate footballers in Bolivia